Pyralosis is a genus of snout moths described by Hans Georg Amsel in 1957.

Species
 Pyralosis polycyclophora (Hampson, 1916)
 Pyralosis terminalis (Rothschild, 1915)

References

Pyralini
Pyralidae genera
Taxa named by Hans Georg Amsel